The International Institute of Differing Civilizations (INCIDI) was an organization based in Brussels, Belgium, founded 
in 1894 as the International Colonial Institute (ICI), that was active until 1980.
It was a forum for discussion of issues related to administration and development of European colonies, and later of post-colonial independent states.

International Colonial Institute

The International Colonial Institute was founded on 8 January 1894 in Brussels, Belgium.
The institute was incorporated under Belgian law, and had its headquarters in Brussels.
Members were elected internationally from among the "distinguished citizens of States possessing colonies or undertaking colonization in their own territory". 
There could be no more than 200 fellows of the institute in the world at any time.
The main statutory objectives of the Institution were:
To facilitate and spread the comparative study of the political science of administration and of colonial legislation.
To promote international relations between statesmen, administrators, and men of science thus engaged.
To organize scientifically an international Bureau of information.
It was taken for granted that the European colonizers had a mission to spread European civilization in their colonies and to guide their backward subjects in a peaceful transition from primitive agricultural societies and animist religions to more advanced industrial and Christian practices.
The institution soon became very influential.
There were 194 members in 1936.
Presidents included Joseph Chailley (1921–1923),  (1923–1925), François Marcal (1929–1936) and Lord Lugard (1936).
The institution held annual sessions in different capitals where various issues were discussed, and plenary sessions every two years or so.
It published a yearbook that gave legislative, administrative and political information about the most important colonies, and monographs on particular subjects.
Congresses were held in Brussels (1920), Paris (1921), Brussels (1923), Rome (1924), The Hague (1927), Brussels (1929), Paris (1931), Lisbonl (1933), London (1936), Rome (1939).

International Institute of Differing Civilizations

After World War II (1939–1945) the term "Colonial" had negative connotations.
In 1946 the institute was renamed to the Institute of political and social sciences applied to countries with different civilizations (Institut international des sciences politiques et sociales appliquées aux pays de civilisations différentes).
It was legally registered in Belgium under this name on 22 April 1949.

As of 1951 the institution, already informally called the Institut international des civilisations différentes, was exclusively scientific in nature and had no official nature.
Its purpose was to promote development of moral and political sciences in places where people of different civilizations were in contact.
The institute would study administrative, political, social, cultural and economic problems due to the contact of these peoples, facilitate exchange of ideas on dealing with these problems and inform world opinion on these issues.
The institute was formally renamed and registered as the International Institute of Differing Civilizations – Institut international des civilisations différentes on 19 February 1954.

The institute wanted to avoid all political and economic influences, and study problems objectively and scientifically.
Participation of former colonies such as India, Pakistan and Indonesia helped show independence of imperialist views.
However, although the institute was well-meaning and idealistic, when discussing the development plans of backward countries its conclusions were very theoretical and of little or no practical use.
Thus, the 1951 conference concluded that:

The institute seems to have become inactive in 1980.

Sample sessions

At the 1911 session Arthur Girault presented a report on recruiting colonial officials, including those of the judiciary.
The International Colonial Institute held its 24th biennial session in Rome in June 1939, chaired by Luigi Federzoni. Attendees discussed the nutrition of natives, the juridical situation of native women and the financial contribution of natives to the expenses of administration. For different reasons, there were no representatives from France, the United States, Spain or Japan. The British representatives were Tracy Philipps and Henry Gollan. 
The 26th Study Session on the INCIDI took place in Paris on 12-15 March 1951. Topics included: Study of the various ways of sustaining cultural, economic and social development plans of underdeveloped territories; Political and social evolution of the autochthonous elites; The problem of languages, mainly in Africa, as an educational and cultural vehicle; Contact of civilizations: the experiences of the North American Continent.
The 28th session of INCIDI was held from 7 to 10 September 1953 at the Hague. It was devoted to the study of rural rehabilitation in tropical and sub-tropical countries.
The 34th ICIDI study session was held in Aix-en-Provence from 11 to 16 September 1967. One of the papers was on ''Urban agglomerations in the states of the Third World".

Notes

Citations

Sources

Organisations based in Brussels